Calceolaria crenata is a perennial plant belonging to family Calceolariaceae and native to the Peruvian Andes and the Ecuadorian Andes. The genus Calceolaria has been recently segregated from other members of the Scrophulariaceae, along with Porodittia, and Jovellana into its own family.

Calceolaria crenata flowers from spring to summer in its native habitat, with clusters of small ( in diameter) yellow flowers.

References

Disintegration of the Scrophulariaceae 

crenata
Flora of Peru
Plants described in 1785